Alien primarily refers to:
 Alien (law), a person in a country who is not a national of that country
 Enemy alien, the above in times of war
 Extraterrestrial life, life which does not originate from Earth
 Specifically, intelligent extraterrestrial beings; see List of alleged extraterrestrial beings
 For fictional extraterrestrial life, see Extraterrestrials in fiction
 Introduced species, a species not native to its environment

Alien(s), or The Alien(s) may also refer to:

Science and technology 
 AliEn (ALICE Environment), a grid framework
 Alien (file converter), a Linux program
 Alien Technology, a manufacturer of RFID technology

Arts and entertainment 
 Alien (franchise), a media franchise
 Alien (creature in Alien franchise)

Films
 Alien (film), a 1979 film by Ridley Scott
 Aliens (film), second film in the franchise from 1986 by James Cameron
 Alien 3, third film in the franchise from 1992 by David Fincher
 Alien Resurrection, fourth film in the franchise from 1997 by Jean-Pierre Jeunet
 Alien vs. Predator (film), fifth film in the franchise from 2004 by Paul W. S. Anderson
 Aliens vs. Predator: Requiem, sixth film in the franchise from 2007 by the Brothers Strause
 Prometheus (2012 film), seventh film in the franchise from 2012 by Ridley Scott
 Alien: Covenant, eighth film in the franchise from 2017 by Ridley Scott
 Alien 2: On Earth, a 1980 unofficial sequel of the 1979 Alien film
Alien Visitor (also titled Epsilon) (1995 film) AustralianItalian science fiction film by Rolf de Heer
 The Alien (2016 film), a 2016 Mexican film
 The Alien (unproduced film), an incomplete 1960s IndianAmerican film
 Alien (2022 film), an upcoming South Korean film

Literature 
 Alien novels, an extension of the Alien franchise
 Aliens: Colonial Marines Technical Manual, a 1995 book by Lee Brimmicombe-Wood, a guide to the fictional United States Colonial Marines
 Aliens (Tappan Wright novel), a 1902 novel by Mary Tappan Wright
 Aliens! (anthology) a 1980 anthology of science fiction edited by Gardner Dozois and Jack Dann
 The Alien (novel), the eighth book in the Animorphs series by Katherine Applegate
 The Aliens (play), a 2010 play by Annie Baker

Music

Performers 
 Alien (band), a 1980s Swedish rock group
 The Aliens (Australian band), a 1970s new wave group
 The Aliens (Scottish band), a 2005–2008 rock group
 The Aliens, the backing band for the American musician Jared Louche on his 1999 solo debut album Covergirl

Albums 
 Alien (soundtrack), 1979
 Alien (Beam album), 2022
 Alien (Northlane album), 2019
 Alien (Strapping Young Lad album), 2005
 Alien, a 1989 EP by Tankard
 Aliens (soundtrack), 1987

Songs 
 "Alien" (Britney Spears song), 2013
 "Alien" (Jonas Blue and Sabrina Carpenter song), 2018
 "Alien", a song by Atlanta Rhythm from the album Quinella, 1981
 "Alien", a song by Bush from the album Sixteen Stone, 1994
 "Alien", a song by Erasure from the album Loveboat, 2000
 "Alien", a song by Japan from the album Quiet Life, 1979
 "Alien", a song by Lamb from the album Fear of Fours, 1999
 "Alien", a song by Nerina Pallot from the album Dear Frustrated Superstar, 2001
 "Alien", a song by P-Model from the album Landsale, 1980
 "Alien", a song by Pennywise from the album Straight Ahead, 1999
 "Alien", a song by Stray Kids from the album SKZ-Replay, 2022
 "Alien", a song by Structures from the album Life Through a Window, 2014
 "Alien", a song by the National from the album First Two Pages of Frankenstein, 2023
 "Alien", a song by Third Day from the album Conspiracy No. 5, 1997
 "Alien", a song by Thriving Ivory from the album Thriving Ivory, 2003
 "Alien", a song by Tokio Hotel from the album Humanoid, 2009
 "Alien", a 2020 song by Lee Su-hyun
 "Alien", a 2020 song by Dennis Lloyd
 "Aliens" (song), a 2017 song by Coldplay
 "Aliens", a 1984 song by Warlord
 "The Alien", a song by Dream Theater from the album A View from the Top of the World, 2021

Video games 
 Alien (1984 video game), based on the film
 Alien (Atari 2600), a 1982 maze game based on the 1979 film
 Alien: Isolation, a 2014 video game based on the Alien science fiction horror film series
 Aliens (1982 video game), a text-only clone of Space Invaders written for the CP/M operating system on the Kaypro computer
 Aliens (1990 video game), a game by Konami, based on the sequel of the film

Other media 
 Alien (Armenian TV series), a 2017 melodrama series
 Alien (sculpture), a 2012 work by David Breuer-Weil, in Mottisfont, Hampshire, England
 Aliens (Dark Horse Comics line)
 The Aliens (TV series), 2016 British sci-fi television series
 "Aliens" (Roseanne), a 1992 television episode

Other uses 
 Alien (shipping company), a Russian company
 Alien Sun (born 1974), Singaporean actress
 Alien, a perfume by Thierry Mugler

See also 
 Alians, an Islamic order
 Alien Project (disambiguation)
 Alien vs. Predator (disambiguation)
 Astrobiology, the study of hypothetical alien life
 ATLiens, a 1996 album by OutKast
 Predator (disambiguation)
 UFO (disambiguation)
 Unidentified flying object (disambiguation)